The Battle of Québec was fought in October 1690 between the colonies of New France and Massachusetts Bay, then ruled by the kingdoms of France and England, respectively. It was the first time Québec's defences were tested.

Following the capture of Port Royal in Acadia, during King William's War, the New Englanders hoped to seize Québec itself, the capital of New France. The loss of the Acadian fort shocked the Canadiens, and Governor-General Louis de Buade de Frontenac ordered the immediate preparation of the city for siege.

When the envoys delivered the terms of surrender, the Governor-General famously declared that his only reply would be by "the mouth of my cannons." Major John Walley led the invading army, which landed at Beauport in the Basin of Québec. However, the militia on the shore were constantly harassed by local militia until their retreat, while the expedition's ships, commanded by Sir William Phips, were nearly destroyed by cannon volley fire from the top of the city.

Both sides learned from the battle: the French improved the city's defences, while the New Englanders realized they needed more artillery and better support from England to take the city.

Background
The colony of New France claimed the largest area of North America, although by population it was numerically inferior to the neighbouring colonies of New England and New York. By 1689, there were only about 14,000 settlers in New France, but most of the population lived in towns protected by elaborate forts.

In 1690, Sir William Phips was appointed major-general by Massachusetts to command an expedition against French Acadia. He sailed with seven vessels carrying a 450-strong provincial "Foot Regiment", and Port Royal surrendered on 21 May. Its governor, Louis-Alexandre des Friches de Menneval, had only about 70 men, and no guns mounted, and would have been unable to resist. On 22 May, Phips recorded "We cut down the cross, rifled the Church, pulled down the High-Altar, breaking their images"; and on 23 May, "kept gathering Plunder both by land and water, and also under ground in their Gardens".

This shocked the French colonists, who feared that their capital city would be the next target. Québec did not have extensive fortifications in 1690, and the whole landward side of the city to the north and west was exposed, particularly at the Plains of Abraham. Count Frontenac returned to Canada for a second term as Governor-General, and ordered the construction of a wooden palisade to enclose the city from the fort at the Château Saint-Louis to the Saint-Charles River. Town Major Provost oversaw the construction of eleven small stone redoubts in this enceinte, which would have protected against cannon. Facing the plains on the west side was the strong point of the landward defences — a windmill called Mont-Carmel where a three-gun artillery battery was in place. The palisade line ended on the east side of the city, near the hospital. The batteries facing the river were also improved, with eight guns mounted beside the Château and six 18-pounders at the docksides. Temporary obstacles had also been put in place on the street leading up to the upper city.

Meanwhile, a mobile war party of 150 Albany militia and Iroquois warriors under Captain John Schuyler marched and canoed overland to Montréal, imitating the petite guerre tactics (long-range expeditions into enemy territory) perfected by the French colonists. Schuyler's expedition was designed to seize Montréal and pin French forces south of Québec, allowing the Boston fleet to sail against the capital unopposed. Smallpox, lack of supplies, and disagreements among the officers caused most of the militia and Iroquois to turn back in disgust, leaving Schuyler with a fraction of the 855 men promised by the New England authorities. On 4 September the English raiders attacked settlements south of Montréal, killing some 50 habitants in the middle of their harvests. Too weak to risk a battle with the town's garrison, Schuyler destroyed some houses and livestock and turned for home with 19 captives before the French militia could respond. Thus, when Phips was sighted off Tadoussac, Frontenac ordered the garrisons of Montréal and Trois-Rivières to make for the threatened capital with all haste. Four days later the Governor arrived in Québec with 200–300 troops made available by the failure of Schuyler's invasion, considerably lifting the capital's spirit of resistance.

Arrival of Phips
While the New England colonies and New York dispatched a force overland against Montréal, which accomplished virtually nothing, Massachusetts launched a separate expedition against Québec. The whole operation had been financed by issuing paper bonds set against the expected booty to be taken from the city. The expedition consisted of about 32 ships (only four of which were of any size) and over 2,300 Massachusetts militiamen, and was under the overall command of Phips, the victor at Port Royal. Its departure was delayed until quite late in the summer because it was waiting (in vain) for the arrival of additional munitions from England. Consequently, when Phips' expedition set out from Hull, Massachusetts on 20 August, it was inadequately supplied with ammunition. Bad weather, contrary winds, and the lack of pilots familiar with the Saint Lawrence River hampered progress, and Phips did not anchor in the Québec basin until 16 October.

Frontenac, a shrewd and experienced officer, reached Québec from Montréal on 14 October. When all the militia whom he had summoned arrived, he had nearly 3,000 men to defend the place. The New Englanders had been "quite confident that the cowardly and effete French would be no match for their hardy men", but in fact the opposite was the case. Frontenac had reason for confidence, as he possessed a force of three battalions of colonial regulars that were certainly superior to Phips's amateur companies—in the event the regulars were not needed as the Canadien militia succeeded in repulsing Phips' landing parties. Furthermore, the city was "sited on the strongest natural position they [the English officers] had likely ever seen." Not only did it have impressive cliffs and Cape Diamond, but the eastern shore was so shallow that ships could not approach and landing craft would be needed.

On 16 October, Phips sent Major Thomas Savage as an envoy to deliver a summons of surrender to Frontenac. The encounter has been described as an application of psychological warfare. Before the fighting, Frontenac led Phips' envoys blindfolded through roaring mobs in the streets of Québec in order to mask his numerical inferiority. Then, in the Château Saint-Louis, Frontenac and many of his officers in their best dress listened to the envoy as he demanded the city's surrender. Overawed by this "stately Hall full of Brave Martiall men", Savage did his best to deliver Phip's ultimatum. Drafted by Massachusetts Puritans, the document began severely:

The New Englander told them they had one hour to comply, and then pulled out his watch. The proud and temperamental Frontenac was so enraged that he wanted to have the envoy hanged before the full view of the English fleet, and it was only because of the Bishop of Québec, François de Laval, that he was calmed. Asked for a written response, Frontenac shot back:

Savage accepted his blindfold with relief and was led back to his ship. Phips' council of war was extremely vexed by the reply, having expected to fall upon a defenceless and panicked city. That evening, drums and fifes were heard approaching Québec, followed by heavy cheering from the town: Louis-Hector de Callière had arrived with the remaining Montréal militia, giving Frontenac numerical parity with the New Englanders.

Battle
The New Englanders saw that the only possible place to crack the defences was on the city's northeastern side, where the walls were weakest. Their plan was to land their main force on the Beauport shore east of the Saint Charles River, and have it cross the river in the fleet's boats, along with the field guns. When the landing force was on the heights west of Québec, the fleet would attack the city and land a second force there. Frontenac had expected the land attack to come from Beauport, and the banks of the river had already been built up with field fortifications on the southwestern side. He proposed to fight only a skirmishing action there, holding his regulars in reserve for a European-style battle on the open ground west of Québec.

However, the open battle never took place. The 1,200-strong English landing force under Major John Walley, Phips' second-in-command, never got across the Saint Charles. Frontenac had sent strong detachments of Colony of Canada militiamen under Jacques Le Moyne de Sainte-Hélène, along with some First Nation warriors, into the wooded areas east of the river. When the English landed on 18 October, they were immediately harassed by Colony of Canada militia, while the ships' boats mistakenly landed the field guns on the wrong side of the Saint Charles. Meanwhile, Phips's four large ships, quite contrary to the plan, anchored before Québec and began bombarding the city until 19 October, at which point the English had shot away most of their ammunition. The French shore batteries had also proved to be much more than a match, and the ships were pounded until the rigging and hulls were badly damaged; the ensign of Phips' flagship the Six Friends was cut down and fell into the river, and under a hail of musket shots, a daring group of members of the colony of Canada paddled a canoe up to the ships to capture it. Unscathed, they triumphantly brought the ensign back to the Governor.

During the bombardment, the land force under Walley remained inactive, suffering from cold and complaining of shortage of rum. After a couple of miserable days, they decided to carry the shore positions and try to overcome the French earthworks. They set out on 20 October "in the best European tradition, with drums beating and colors unfurled," but there was a skirmish at the edge of the woods. The New Englanders could not cope with the maintained heavy Colony of Canada fire, and the brass field guns fired into the woods had no effect. Although Sainte-Hélène was mortally wounded, 150 of the attackers had been killed in action, and were utterly discouraged. They retreated in a state of near panic on 22 October, even abandoning five field guns on the shore.

Aftermath
On 23 and 24 October, an exchange of prisoners was negotiated and effected, and the ships set sail for Boston. Although Phips' own account of the expedition admitted only 30 dead in combat, smallpox and marine accident claimed about 1,000 more. James Lloyd of Boston wrote in the following January, "7 vessels yet wanting 3 more cast away & burnt." Cotton Mather tells how one brigantine was wrecked on Anticosti; her crew maintained themselves on the island through the winter and were apparently rescued the following summer by a ship from Boston. Phips' defeat was complete and disastrous; fortunately for the French, since food was lacking to feed the large force assembled to defend Quebec in case of a prolonged siege. Phips himself had displayed no natural military talents to offset his lack of experience. However, it can be argued that it was the absence of trained soldiers and adequate supplies that had doomed the enterprise from the start. Governor of New York Henry Sloughter captured the mood in the English colonies when he wrote:

Canada exulted in its victory and survival; on 5 November the Te Deum was sung in Québec in the chapel of a new church that would be named Notre Dame de la Victoire, Our Lady of Victory. When news of the expedition reached Versailles, Louis XIV ordered a medal struck bearing the inscription: Kebeca liberata M.DC.XC–Francia in novo orbe victrix, or "Deliverance of Québec 1690–France victorious in the New World."

Jacques Le Moyne, who died soon after the battle, was mourned by the whole colony for his courtesy and valour. The Onondaga Iroquois sent a wampum collar as a token of sympathy, and released two captives to honour his memory. His brother, Charles Le Moyne, won fame for his part in the battle, and he later received an additional grant of land for his services and became the first Baron de Longueuil.

Both sides learned from the battle. The French victory showed that to take Québec, the cannon of "Old England would have to be brought in". Similarly, Frontenac realised the defences needed significant improvement, and in 1692, he gave Ingénieur du Roi Josué Berthelot de Beaucours the task of designing a fortress that could withstand a European-style siege. This was delayed by the Canadian winter, and work commenced in the summer of 1693 on an earth rampart with large bastions to enclose the city, and pointed wooden stakes to top the walls. A complete shore battery, known as the "Royal battery", was built immediately after the siege. It was shaped like a small bastion, and featured 14 gun embrasures to cover both sides of the Saint Laurence and the river itself.

Although another expedition was launched against Québec during Queen Anne's War, it failed to reach its target when transports wrecked with great loss of life in the Gulf of St. Lawrence. The city's improved defences would not be tested until the Battle of the Plains of Abraham in 1759.

Notes

References

External links

King William's War
Battles involving England
Battles involving Canada
Conflicts in Quebec
Conflicts in 1690
1690 in Canada
1690 in the Thirteen Colonies
Battle of (1690)
1690 in New France